Prabal Panjabi is an Indian actor who appears in Bollywood films. In 2011, Panjabi made his debut in Y Films' Mujhse Fraaandship Karoge, and Mere Dad Ki Maruti (2013).

Career
Prior to his film debut, Panjabi acted in Disney's television series Kya Mast Hai Life (2009–2010). He also did few TVCs and short films.

Recently he appeared in the Sci fi movie Cargo.

Filmography

Television

See also

 List of Indian film actors

References

External links
 
 

Living people
Indian male film actors
Male actors in Hindi cinema
Indian male television actors
People from Noida
Delhi Public School alumni
University of Mumbai alumni
21st-century Indian male actors